Oleksiy Leonidovych Neizhpapa (born 9 October 1975) is a Ukrainian vice admiral. He is Commander of the Naval Forces of the Ukrainian Navy.

He received his promotion to vice admiral two days after the sinking of the Russian Black Sea Fleet's flagship Moskva.

References

1975 births
Living people
Naval commanders of Ukraine